The Maid of the Mountains, called in its original score a musical play, is an operetta or "Edwardian" musical comedy in three acts. The music was by Harold Fraser-Simson, with additional music by James W. Tate, lyrics by Harry Graham and additional lyrics by Frank Clifford Harris and Valentine, and the book was written by Frederick Lonsdale, best known for his later society comedies such as On Approval. After an initial try-out at the Prince's Theatre in Manchester on 23 December 1916, the show was rewritten and opened at Daly's Theatre in London on 10 February 1917.

Produced by Robert Evett (after being turned down by Frank Curzon) and directed by Oscar Asche (who had directed the record-setting hit Chu Chin Chow), The Maid of the Mountains ran for 1,352 performances in its initial London run – closing mainly because of the nervous exhaustion of its female lead, José Collins. This highly profitable run saved the George Edwardes estate, then being managed by Evett, from bankruptcy.

The original New York production (1918) did not catch on, only running for 37 performances. However, Asche also directed the first Australian production for J. C. Williamson's in Australia in 1917, followed by another production in 1923. This became as successful as the London production, with soprano Gladys Moncrieff becoming famous as Teresa.  The show had major London revivals in 1921, 1930, 1942 (starring Sylvia Cecil at the London Coliseum) and 1972 in an Emile Littler production at the Palace Theatre in the West End, and at the Finborough Theatre, London, in December 2006 with a cast including Anita Louise Combe, as well as numerous other professional productions elsewhere.

The musical was popular with amateur theatre groups, particularly in Britain, from the 1930s to about 1970.

Background
The Maid of the Mountains was one of the three most important musical hits of the London stage during World War I (the other two being a revue entitled The Bing Boys Are Here and the musical Chu Chin Chow, music or scenes from all of these have been included as background in many films set in this period, and they remain intensely evocative of the "Great War" years.  Other hit shows of the period were Theodore & Co (1916), The Boy (1917), and Yes, Uncle! (1917).  Audiences wanted light and uplifting entertainment during the war, and these shows delivered it.

Some of the most popular songs were:  "Love Will find a Way", "A Bachelor Gay", "A Paradise for Two", "My life is Love", and "Live for Today".

The "romantic" ending, with Teresa finally united to Baldassaré, was personally insisted on by José Collins (in the play as originally written, she ended up with the faithful but less colourful character of Beppo).  Beppo and Teresa's duets remain, however, and the role of Baldassaré remains a non-singing part.

Synopsis
The Maid of the Mountains is an escapist story set in a bandit camp, high up in the mountains (presumably in Italy).  The bandit maid Teresa loves the bandit chief, Baldassaré, who is feared by the whole country.  Baldassaré's men are unhappy because of the decision of Baldassaré to disband, and they ask Teresa to dissuade him.  Baldassaré gives Teresa and the others their shares of the spoils of many raids.  He tells her that she must leave at once, because their hiding place is surrounded.  She pleads to be allowed to stay, but goes sadly.  The local Governor, General Malona, captures Teresa and brings her to the Palace of Santo.  He wishes to capture the rebel band before the impending end of his term of office.  He promises Teresa her freedom if Baldassaré is captured.  Teresa refuses, as "there is honour among thieves."

Meanwhile, Baldassaré and some of his band have seized the new Governor, Count Orsino.  Donning the uniforms of the captives, the brigands proceed to Santo to rescue Teresa. Baldassaré meets and falls in love with Angela, the daughter of the retiring Governor, and becomes heedless of his danger in remaining in the town.  He pretends to be the new governor.  Beppo, one of the brigands who has always been in love with Teresa, asks her to persuade Baldassaré to leave the capital lest they all be discovered.  Teresa, mad with jealousy because of Baldassaré's love for Angela, exposes the new "governor" as Baldassaré, and he and his companions are arrested and sent to Devil's Island.

Later, Teresa, who sadly regrets betraying Baldassaré, pleads with the General to release him.  In the loneliness of his imprisonment, Baldassaré realises that his regard for Angela was only a passing infatuation, and that he loves Teresa.  He forgives her betrayal of him and, with the assistance of Lieutenant Rugini, the Governor of the prison, they escape by boat.  All ends happily for Teresa and her bandit chief.

Roles and principal cast

Teresa – José Collins (1)
Baldasarre – Arthur Wontner
Gen. Malona – Mark Lester
Tonio – Lauri de Frece
Beppo – Thorpe Bates
Carlo
Andrea
Pietro
Lieutenant Rugini

Crumpet
Mayor of Santo
Vittoria
Angela
Gianetta
Maria
Marietta
Beppiria
Pepita

(1) José Collins, who sang the part of Teresa, the bandit "Maid", throughout the original run, became a star as the result of her performance.

Musical numbers 

1. "Friends Have to Part" - Opening Chorus
2. "Live for Today" - Beppo and chorus of men
3. "My Life Is Love" - Teresa, Beppo and bandits
4. "Nocturne - Orchestra Farewell" - Teresa
5. "Dividing the Spoils" - Chorus
6. "Finale Act I" - Company
7. "Introduction & Opening Chorus Act II"
8. "Love Will Find a Way" - Teresa
9. "Laughing Chorus Dirty Work" - Governor and Tonio
10. "A Paradise for Two" - Teresa and Beppo
11. "Husbands and Wives" - Vittoria and Tonio
12. "A Bachelor Gay" - Beppo
13. "Finale Act II"
14. "Opening Chorus Act III" - Chorus of Fisherfolk
15. "Good People Gather Round" - Governor, Teresa and Chorus
16. "When You're in Love" - Teresa and General Malona
17. "Over There and Over Here" - Vittorio and Tonio
18. "Finale Act III Friendship and Love" - Teresa and Beppo

Adaptations
The piece was adapted to a British film in 1932, directed by Lupino Lane. It starred Nancy Brown as Teresa and Harry Welchman as Baldasarre.

See also
Maids of the Mountain Hockey Club

Notes

References
 Gammond, Peter (1993). The Oxford Companion to Popular Music, reprinted, with corrections. Oxford: Oxford University Press. 
 Larkin, Colin (1994). The Guinness Who's Who of Stage Musicals. Enfield: Guinness Publishing. 
Information about productions

External links
Review of the recording, analyzing the score
Guide to Musical Theatre synopsis and other information
Photos from Maid of the Mountains
List of longest running plays in London and New York
Hyperion page on the recording, accessed 12 September 2013

1917 musicals
1916 operas
1917 operas
Films shot at British International Pictures Studios
British comedy films
English-language operettas
Operas by Harold Fraser-Simson
Musicals by Frederick Lonsdale
British musicals